Pingyang (平阳) may refer to:

Linfen, formerly known as Pingyang, prefecture-level city of Shanxi
Princess Pingyang (平陽公主; d. 623), Chinese princess of the Tang Dynasty
Pingyang County (平阳县), Wenzhou, Zhejiang
Pingyang Township (平阳乡), Rongjiang County, Guizhou

Towns
Pingyang, Tailai County (平洋镇), Heilongjiang
Written as "平阳镇":
Pingyang, Beihai, in Yinhai District, Beihai, Guangxi
Pingyang, Laibin, in Xingbin District, Laibin, Guangxi
Pingyang, Fuping County, Hebei
Pingyang, Gannan County, Heilongjiang
Pingyang, Jidong County, Heilongjiang